Hollington is a village in the Staffordshire Moorlands in English county of Staffordshire. There are several villages of this same name, and there is a Hollington, Derbyshire a few miles to the east in Derbyshire. The population taken at the 2011 census was 212.

The village has a church and two pubs, The Star and The Raddle. There is a village hall. There used to be a village shop, but this closed in 1992.

The nearest town to Hollington is the market town of Uttoxeter just under five miles to the south east, or Cheadle to the north west. The village is situated on the south eastern corner of high ground, with a ridge extending to the south and deep valleys to the north, and enjoys beautiful views. The hamlet of Great Gate lies a mile to the north east. It is close to Croxden Abbey, Rocester and Alton Towers. An ancient Roman road runs through the village, from through Rocester and Derby (Roman Derventio) in the east, the Derbyshire section being called Long Lane, and onwards to the north west through the village of Upper Tean.

The quarries at Hollington produce the notable pink-red and white "Hollington stone" (a type of sandstone) which has been used for centuries in the construction of churches and stately homes. It was used for the construction of the new Coventry Cathedral in the 1950s.

See also
Listed buildings in Checkley

References

External links

Villages in Staffordshire
Towns and villages of the Peak District